Park Jin-young (Western style: Jinyoung Park) is a Korean name. People with this name include:

 Park Jin-young (born 1971), South Korean singer-songwriter and founder of entertainment conglomerate JYP Entertainment
 Park Jin-young (entertainer, born 1994), South Korean singer and member of GOT7
 Park Jin-young (swimmer) (born 1997), South Korean swimmer
 Jinyoung Park (mathematician), proposer of proof of the Kahn–Kalai conjecture

See also
Park Ji-young (disambiguation)